Rosatom, also known as Rosatom State Nuclear Energy Corporation, the State Atomic Energy Corporation Rosatom or Rosatom State Corporation, is a Russian state corporation headquartered in Moscow that specializes in nuclear energy, nuclear non-energy goods and high-tech products. Established in 2007, the organization comprises more than 350 enterprises, including scientific research organizations, a nuclear weapons complex, and the world's only nuclear icebreaker fleet.

The organization is the largest electricity generating company in Russia, producing 215.746 TWh of electricity, 20.28% of the country's total electricity production. The corporation ranks first in overseas NPP construction, responsible for 76% of global nuclear technology exports: 35 nuclear power plant units, at different stages of development, in 12 countries, as of December 2020. Rosatom also manufactures equipment, produces isotopes for nuclear medicine, carries out research, and conducts material studies; it also produces supercomputers and software as well as different nuclear and non-nuclear innovative products. Rosatom plans to further develop renewable energy and wind power. Two units are being built in Russia at Kursk-2 NPP with plans announced for 2 more units at Kola NPP. Rosatom has a  38% world market share, and in 2019, lead in global uranium enrichment services (36%) and covers 16% of the global nuclear fuel market.

In 2020, Rosatom approved its updated strategy emphasizing the role of new products, both nuclear non-energy and non-nuclear, in approximately 100 new business areas, including nuclear medicine, composites, wind energy, hydrogen, waste management, additive technology, production of hydrogen.

Rosatom is a nonprofit organization, and while its tasks include the development of nuclear energy, the growth of enterprises of the nuclear fuel cycle, and the fulfillment of the functions assigned to it by the state, it also ensures national security (nuclear deterrence), nuclear and radiation safety, as well as development of applied and fundamental science. In addition, the state corporation is authorized on behalf of the state to fulfill Russia's international obligations in the field of the use of nuclear energy and of non-proliferation of nuclear materials. Rosatom is also involved with large-scale projects such as ITER and FAIR.

As of February 2021, the total portfolio orders of Rosatom reached $250 billion. According to the 2020 corporate report, its 10-year foreign order portfolio stood at $138.3 billion, while revenue reached $7.5 billion. The 10-year order portfolio for new products stood at ₽1,602.1 billion while revenue reached ₽261.1 billion.

History 

Several Soviet and Russian government entities with different tasks are among the Rosatom predecessors. On 26 June 1953, the Council of Ministers transformed the First Main Directorate in charge of nuclear weapons program into the Ministry of Medium Machine Building (MinSredMash). The ministry was entrusted with the development of the civic nuclear power program. In 1989, Minsredmash and the Ministry of Atomic Energy merged to form the Ministry of Nuclear Engineering and Industry of the USSR.

The Ministry for Atomic Energy of the Russian Federation [(Russian: Министерство по атомной энергии Российской Федерации, also known as Minatom (Russian: Минaтом)] was established as a successor to the Russian part of the Ministry of Nuclear Engineering and Industry of the USSR on 29 January 1992, after the dissolution of the Soviet Union. The newly created ministry received about 80% of the enterprises of the union department, including 9 nuclear power plants with 28 power units. Under this name, the ministry existed until 9 March 2004, when it was transformed into the Federal Agency on Atomic Energy.

On 1 December 2007, Russian President Vladimir Putin signed a law adopted by the Federal Assembly under which the Federal Atomic Energy Agency were to be abolished, and its powers and assets were to be transferred to the newly created "State Atomic Energy Corporation Rosatom." On 12 December of the same year, the agency transformed into a state corporation.

In 2017, Rosatom decided to invest in wind power, believing that rapid cost reductions in the renewable industry will become a competitive threat to nuclear power, and started to build wind turbines. Rosatom was also concerned that nuclear export opportunities were becoming exhausted. In October, Rosatom was reported to be considering postponing commissioning new nuclear plants in Russia due to excess generation capacity and that new nuclear electricity prices are higher than for existing plant. The Russian government is considering reducing support for new nuclear under its support contracts, called Dogovor Postavki Moshnosti (DPM), which guarantee developers a return on investment through increased payments from consumers for 20 years.

On 28 June 2017, The Financial Times criticized Rosatom for lack of transparency regarding an alleged expansionist agenda through its role as a "Kremlin-controlled company". On 20 March 2018, this criticism was underlined by the Bellona Foundation, who focused on the scarce data available on Rosatom's progress in Sudan.

On 20 August 2020, Rosatom marked the 75th anniversary of the Russian nuclear industry. As part of the celebration, Rosatom launched its rebranding campaign “United Rosatom,” which made subsidiaries in the nuclear industry utilize the Rosatom's Moebius strip logo. In 2020, Rosatom set a goal of tripling its revenue to ₽4 trillion by 2030, 40% of which is set to come from new lines of business, with primarily focus on sustainable tech.

Within the next two days after Russian military forces occupied Ukraine's Chernobyl Nuclear Power Plant on 24 February 2022, Rosatom employees have gained an unauthorized access to the plant, threatened the Ukrainian personnel and demanded the plant's manuals, procedures and other documentation.

Since 12 March 2022, once Russian military forces occupied Ukraine's Zaporizhzhia Nuclear Power Plant, Rosatom employees have gained an access and set a base there without permission of the plant's owner Energoatom. Rosatom engineers have demanded documentation and manuals on the plant's operation. Rosatom spokeswoman said that its employees are present at Zaporizhzhia Nuclear Power Plant to ensure the safety of the plant and are not involved in its management or security.

On 29 September 2022 the International Atomic Energy Agency was told by a Ukrainian ambassador that Rosatom had sent more officials to Zaporizhzhia Nuclear Power Plant to enforce the change in ownership from Ukraine to Russia and to give the plant employees two weeks to apply for work with Rosatom. Allowing Russia to claim ownership of Zaporizhzhia would represent the biggest nuclear theft in history.

Organization 
As of early 2021, Rosatom included 356 of various organizational and legal forms. Some belong to the enterprises of the nuclear power complex, which comprises organizations of nuclear energy, nuclear engineering, and the nuclear fuel cycle, including enterprises for the exploration and production of natural uranium, conversion and enrichment of uranium, production of nuclear fuel, electricity and equipment, development of new technologies for the nuclear fuel and gas centrifuge platform. Others belong to the growing number of new businesses outside of nuclear power, including wind energy, composite materials, additive technologies, nuclear medicine, among others. The civilian assets of the Russian nuclear industry are concentrated within Rosatom's holding company Atomenergoprom, which unites 204 enterprises as of December 2020.

The Rosatom companies are integrated into multiple divisions:

Mining division 
The holding company of the Rosatom mining division is JSC Atomredmetzoloto, which consolidates Russian uranium mining assets. Key daughter companies include JSC Khiagda and JSC Dalur.

Uranium One is a separate global mining company that operates directly under Rosatom with a diverse portfolio of assets in Kazakhstan, USA and Tanzania.

Fuel division 

The managing company of the Rosatom fuel division is JSC TVEL, which is a leading organization on the global nuclear fuel cycle front-end market and the only supplier of nuclear fuel for Russian NPPs and the nuclear-powered icebreaker fleet.

Key daughter companies include Bochvar National Research Institute for Inorganic Materials, Siberian Chemical Combine, and Chepetskiy Mechanical Plant.

The division's tasks include the fabrication of nuclear fuel, conversion and enrichment of uranium, and the production of gas centrifuges.

Uranium enrichment is carried out at four TVEL Fuel Company plants, including Angarsk Electrochemical Plant in Angarsk, Irkutsk oblast, Zelenogorsk Electrochemical Plant in Zelenogorsk, Krasnoyarsk Krai, Ural Electrochemical Plant in Novouralsk, Sverdlovsk oblast, and the Siberian Chemical Plant in Seversk, Tomsk oblast. Uranium is enriched using an advanced gas centrifuge technology to separate uranium isotopes. Depleted uranium hexafluoride is converted to an oxide form at the W-ECP unit of Zelenogorsk Electrochemical Plant.

Nuclear fuel is produced at Rosatom's Machine-building plant (JSC MSZ) and Novosibirsk Chemical Concentrates Plant (JSC NCCP). The plants produce UO2-based (enriched fresh and reprocessed uranium) nuclear fuel for all models of Russian power and research reactors, as well as for many foreign power and research reactor models and for Russian ship-based power installations. The development of accident tolerant fuel for VVER and PWR reactors has now entered the stage of testing.

MOX fuel for fast sodium reactors is produced at the Mining and Chemical Combine, while uranium-plutonium mixed fuel will be produced at the Siberian Chemical Plant, which is currently under construction. A uranium-plutonium fuel REMIX (regenerated mixture) being tested for VVER reactors; its commercial production is expected to take place at the Mining and Chemical Combine.

SNF reprocessing is carried out at the Mayak Production Association at the RT-1 plant. The plant is currently processing the spent nuclear fuel (of various compositions) from power reactors (BN-350, VVER-440, BN-600, RBMK-1000, VVER-1000; BN-MOX), from the research reactors of Russian and foreign scientific centres, and from the reactors of submarine and surface naval fleet transport power plants.

Mechanical engineering division 
The managing company is JSC Atomenergomash. It is one of Russia's largest groups of mechanical engineering enterprises offering a full range of solutions for the design, manufacture and supply of equipment for the nuclear power industry. The division comprises more than 10 production sites, including production enterprises, engineering centers and research organizations in Russia, Ukraine, the Czech Republic, and Hungary.

According to the group's own data, 14% of nuclear power plants in the world and 40% of thermal power stations in the CIS and the Baltic states use the holding equipment. In addition, the division is the largest producer of equipment for the VVER reactor and the world's only producer of the fast-neutron reactor (BN reactor). Its enterprises are also responsible for design and manufacturing of reactors for SMR nuclear power plants, both onshore and offshore, as well as nuclear icebreakers.

Key daughter companies include OKB Gidropress, OKBM Afrikantov, JSC Machine-Building Factory of Podolsk, and AEM-technology.

Engineering division 
The managing company is JSC ASE EC, which has extensive capabilities for managing the construction of complex engineering facilities. The main business areas of the division include design and construction of large NPPs in Russia and abroad, and developing digital technologies for managing complex engineering facilities based on the Multi-D platform.

Key companies include JSC Atomenergoproekt, and JSC ATOMPROEKT.

Power engineering division 
The managing company is JSC Rosenergoatom. It is the only NPP operator in Russia and a key player in the Russian electricity market. Its main business areas include power and heat generation at NPPs and acting as the operator of nuclear facilities (nuclear power plants), radiation sources and facilities storing nuclear materials and radioactive substances

Key companies include all Russian NPPs, JSC AtomEnergoRemont, JSC AtomEnergoSbyt, and TITAN-2 construction holding.

Back-end division 
The managing company is JSC Federal Center for Nuclear and Radiation Safety. It is dedicated to a centralized system for management of spent nuclear fuel and radioactive waste, as well as decommissioning of hazardous nuclear and radiological facilities.

Key companies include FSUE Mining and Chemical Combine , FSUE Radon, NO RWM.

R&D division 
The managing company is JSC Science and Innovations. Key companies include Russian Scientific Center (RSC) – A.I. Leipunskiy IPPE, NII NPO Luch, and the Research Institute of Atomic Reactors.

Northern Sea Route 
The development of the Northern Sea Route has become a Rosatom priority after the company was appointed its infrastructure operator in late 2018. Rosatom seeks to organize ship navigation within the NSR, develop the infrastructure of seaports, including energy, create a navigation safety system, as well as navigational and hydrographic support. In addition, several Rosatom entities are involved in the development of international transit sea freight traffic along the Northern Sea Transit Corridor.

Key companies include FSUE Atomflot, Directorate of the Northern Sea Route, Rusatom Cargo.

Wind power division 
In 2017, Rosatom decided to invest in wind turbine manufacturing, believing that rapid cost reductions in the renewable industry will become a competitive threat to nuclear power. Russia had recently offered subsidies for domestically built renewable technology.

The managing company is JSC NovaWind. This Rosatom's division concentrates its efforts in advanced areas of wind energy generation technology.

Key companies include WindSGC, WindSGC-2, and Atompowerindustry Trade.

Nuclear medicine division 
The managing company is JSC Rusatom Healthcare. It has been historically developed at various enterprises of the Russian nuclear industry. In 2017, Rosatom established the division to bring together assets and expertise in healthcare. The nuclear medicine division is in charge of nuclear medicine, manufacturing and distribution of radioisotope products and radiation sterilisation equipment, as well as creation of integrated turnkey solutions for medicine.

Key companies include JSC Isotope and NIITFA. In February 2022, Rusatom Healthcare acquired 25,001% of shares of Medscan group, the rest of shares still being hold by its major shareholder, Yevgeny Tugolukov.

Advanced materials and technologies division 
The managing company is JSC UMATEX, which is engaged in production of carbon fiber and fiber-based items, as well as R&D and engineering support to its partners.

Key companies include JSC Khimprominzhiniring, R&D centre, and LLC ALABUGA-FIBRE.

Digital products division 
The managing company is the Digitalization Unit of Rosatom, which is engaged in solving tasks in three main areas:

The participation in the digitalization of Russia, as Rosatom is the center of competences of the Federal Project Digital Technologies within the National Program Digital Economy.

The development of digital products for nuclear power and beyond.

The internal digitalization of the Russian nuclear industry, making it independent from foreign technologies in critical areas.

Key companies include Cifrum and Rusatom Digital Solutions.

Infrastructure solutions division 

The managing company is JSC Rusatom Infrastructure Solutions. It is responsible for the coordination of innovation and advanced technologies of Rosatom organizations for effective urban management, improving quality of life, creating a comfortable and safe urban environment as part of the “Smart City” program. Another area of expertise is the production of fresh water, which includes the development of solutions for desalination, water treatment, and water purification. The company develops, builds, modernizes, maintains water supply, water purification and water treatment facilities for energy, petrochemical, food, and other industries.

Additive manufacturing division 
The managing company is Rusatom Additive Technologies. It connects together the scientific and production companies of Rosatom in order to develop the area of additive production in Russia. It controls design and production of 3D-printers, additive powders, complete sets, software, and 3D-printing services.

Energy storage systems division 
The managing company is LLC RENERA, which is engaged in the development of lithium-ion traction batteries for electric transport and fixed systems for energy accumulation, as well as products for emergency and uninterruptible power supply and storage systems for renewable energy.

Process control systems and electrical engineering division 
The managing company is JSC Rusatom Automated Control Systems. It builds comprehensive solutions for automation of production processes, manufactures and supplies electrical equipment, designs and constructs electricity supply facilities.

Environmental solutions division 
The managing company is FSUE Federal Environmental Operator.

Sales and trading division 
The managing company is Techsnabexport (TENEX), which is in charge of international export of uranium enrichment services and products. Techsnabexport was founded in 1963 as a foreign trade agent of the Soviet nuclear industry, the company is known on the foreign market under the trademark TENEX. In 1993, a Russian-American intergovernmental program, the Megatons to Megawatts Program, in which the aims were converting highly enriched uranium extracted from Russian nuclear warheads into low-enriched uranium for use by American nuclear power plants, was signed thanks to Techsnabexport's efforts, and lasted until 2013. By the end of the agreement, about 500 tons of weapons-grade uranium were recycled from 20,000 Russian warheads. The fuel thus produced provided about half of all energy produced by US nuclear power plants (and about 10% of all electricity produced in the US).

Operations

Nuclear power plants 
The management company Rosenergoatom operates all of Russia's nuclear power plants and represents the electric power division of the state corporation Rosatom. As of April 2021, 11 nuclear power plants (38 power units) operated in Russia with a total capacity of 30.5 GW, producing about 20.28% of all electricity produced in Russia.

In operation 

As a result of reforms and reassignments in the period from 2012 to 2014, Rosatom's engineering activities were concentrated within the management company Atomenergoproekt-Atomstroyexport (NIAEP-ASE), based in Nizhny Novgorod. Earlier, Atomstroyexport was engaged in foreign construction, and a number of independent engineering institutes with the name Atomenergoproekt were engaged in the design and construction of facilities in Russia: Moscow, St. Petersburg, and Nizhny Novgorod. Since October 2014 on the basis of NIAEP-ASE, Rosatom forms a unified engineering division, not including design company on nuclear power facilities and technologies Atomproekt. According to Kommersant, such a strategy is aimed at eliminating internal competition, deliberately created earlier. This measure can be effective from the economic point of view in view of a large number of domestic and foreign orders.

Floating nuclear power plants

Under construction 

Rosatom is one of the world leaders in the number of simultaneously constructed power units. As of late 2021, Rosatom is building two new power units in Russia at Kursk Nuclear Power Plant II, and there are 35 power units at different stages of implementation abroad. Construction of a nuclear power plant in Kaliningrad started on 25 February 2010, but was suspended for the project to be redesigned.

There are also plans to build two more units at Leningrad NPP, two units at Smolensk NPP, two more units at Novovoronezh NPP and two more units at Kursk NPP. In mid-June 2021, Rosatom announced that two 600 MW VVER reactors will be added to Kola NPP with the first coming online in 2034. In early June 2021, construction of the BREST-OD-300 reactor started. It will be the world's first experimental demonstration power unit featuring a lead-cooled fast neutron reactor.

Abroad 

Rosatom has the world's largest portfolio of foreign NNP construction projects with a market share of 74%. At the time of Russia's invasion of Ukraine, Rosatom had 73 projects in 29 countries.

37% of nuclear reactors under construction worldwide being built by Rosatom itself, usually the OKB Gidropress' VVER type. Rosatom received $66.5 billion of foreign orders in 2012, including $28.9 billion for nuclear plant construction, $24.7 billion for uranium products and $12.9 billion for nuclear fuel exports and associated activities. In 2020, Rosatom received $138.3 billion of foreign orders, including $89.1 billion for nuclear plant construction, $13.3 billion for uranium products and $35.8 billion for nuclear fuel exports and associated activities. Nuclear power plants in China, India, and Iran, were either designed and built by Rosatom or with the corporation's participation. Rosatom is involved with the construction of the Tianwan Nuclear Power Plant in China, the construction of Kudankulam Nuclear Power Plant in India, and the construction of the Belarusian Nuclear Power Plant in Belarus.

In December 2013, Rosatom signed a €6.4 billion contract with Fennovoima in Finland of the single-unit Hanhikivi NPP using OKB Gidropress' VVER-1200 pressurized water reactor in the town of Pyhäjoki, with construction planned to start after 2021, but the contract was cancelled in May 2022 by Finland for Russian invasion of Ukraine. In December 2014, Rosatom and the MVM Group of Hungary signed an agreement for the construction of new station units of the Paks NPP with construction planned to start in 2022. Rosatom also started construction of Turkey's Akkuyu NPP on 3 April 2018. Rosatom  has signed agreements with Egypt on construction of the El-Dabaa NPP and with Bangladesh on construction of the Rooppur NPP, with construction starting on 30 November 2017.

Failed bids includes the cancellation of Units 3 and 4 of Khmelnytskyi NPP in Ukraine.

Small reactors and floating nuclear plants 
Rosatom has practical experience operating small reactors in the Far North, including the four EGP-6 reactor-equipped power units of Bilibino NPP. In 2019, the floating nuclear power plant Akademik Lomonosov, equipped with two KLT-40 reactors, was connected to the grid in the Russian town of Pevek. Akademic Lomonosov has an electric power capacity of 70 MW and a thermal power capacity of 50 Gcal/h. Rosatom's new floating nuclear power plant projects will be equipped with RITM-200 reactors, which are used in Project 22220 icebreakers. Rosatom also has ground-based small nuclear power plant projects equipped with RITM-200 reactors. In November 2020, Rosatom announced plans to place a land-based RITM-200 SMR in the isolated town of Ust-Kuyga, Yakutia. In early August 2021, the Russian nuclear regulator granted a license to Rusatom Overseas JSC, allowing the company to build nuclear installations at nuclear power plants within the framework of the project in Yakutia.

Rosatom offers land, water, and submarine versions of the small modular reactor “Shelf” for consumers in the ≤ 10 MW power range. The company also developed the SVBR-100 lead-bismuth fast reactor for consumers in the ≤ 100 MW power range, though the latter project is currently frozen.

Research reactors 
According to the Research Reactor Database (RRDB), maintained by the IAEA, Russia has 54 research reactors, which are largely based at Rosatom enterprises and institutes. Most of Russia's research reactors were built in the USSR, in the early stages of the development of the nuclear energy sector. Today, Rosatom's largest research reactor project is the Multipurpose Fast Neutron Research Reactor (MBIR), which is currently under construction. Based in Dimitrovgrad, Ulyanovsk oblast, the reactor will be the world leader among high-flux research facilities. Its unique physical characteristics are best suited for material science experiments, such as testing innovative fuel and new coolants.

Rosatom provides support to its foreign partners in the creation of nuclear science and technology centres, including scientific laboratories and research reactors. The company is currently building the first centre of such type in Bolivia, which will be commissioned in 2024. Another contract to build similar facilities in Zambia was signed in 2018.

Two-component structure of nuclear power 
In 2018, Rosatom adopted a long-term strategy through year 2100, for the development of nuclear energy in accordance with the following goals:

 To form the basis for the generation of carbon-free energy and be competitive in other forms of generation of electric and thermal energy;
 To promote the highest possible high-tech export of nuclear power plants, research reactors, nuclear fuel, equipment, and services in the nuclear technology market;
 To ensure the conservation of organic uranium reserves for non-energy use;
 To solve environmental problems and fulfill Russia's international obligations of carbon dioxide emissions reduction.

In pursuit of achieving these goals, Rosatom is transitioning to a two-component nuclear power structure that operates in a closed-loop heavy metal (uranium, plutonium, and minor actinides) fuel cycle that simultaneously involves thermal and fast reactors. VVER reactors, with their improved adjustments, were selected as thermal reactors and BN (sodium-cooled) and BREST/BR (lead-cooled) reactors were selected as fast reactors. In such a system, spent nuclear fuel is considered a valuable raw material instead of nuclear waste, as it could be further used for fresh fuel fabrication. Rosatom is currently at the first stage of transitioning to a two-component structure.

Icebreaker fleet 

Since 2008, the structure of Rosatom includes the Russian nuclear icebreaker fleet, which is the largest in the world with five nuclear-powered icebreakers , a container ship, and four service vessels. Its tasks include navigation on the routes of the Northern Sea Route and rescue operations in ice. Operation and maintenance of the fleet is carried out by FSUE Atomflot, also known as Rosatomflot, a company based in Murmansk.

Corporate governance

Supervisory Board 

The highest executive body of Rosatom is the supervisory board, consisting of nine people, including the chairman. The board is headed since 2005 by chairman Sergey Kiriyenko. Other Board members are:
 Igor Borovkov - the head of the apparatus of the Military-Industrial Commission
 Larisa Brychyova- Assistant to the President of Russia
 Alexey Likhachev - General Director of Rosatom
 Andrei Klepach - Deputy Minister for Economic Development
 Sergey Korolev - Director for Economic Security of the Federal Security Service
 Alexander Novak - Minister of Energy of Russia
 Yuriy P. Trutnev - representative of the President of Russia in the Far-Eastern Federal District
 Yuriy V. Ushakov - Assistant to the President of Russia

Management Board 
Strategies, policies and objectives of Rosatom are established by its management board, consisting of fourteen people, including the General Director. The board is headed since 2016 by General Director Alexey Likhachev.
 Alexey Likhachev - General Director of Rosatom
 Ivan Kamenskikh - First Deputy Director General for Nuclear Weapons
 Kirill Komarov - First Deputy Director General for Corporate Development and International Business
 Alexander Lokshin - First Deputy Director General for Operations Management
 Nikolay Solomon - First Deputy Director General for Corporate Functions and CFO
 Konstantin Denisov - Deputy Director General for Security
 Sergey Novikov - State Secretary – Deputy Director General for Execution of State Powers and Budgeting
 Nikolay Spassky - Deputy Director General for International Relations
 Oleg Kryukov - Director for Public Policy on Radioactive Waste, Spent Nuclear Fuel and Nuclear Decommissioning
 Andrey Nikipelov - CEO of Atomenergomash
 Sergey Obozov - Director for Rosatom Production System, Member of Rosenergoatom's Board of Directors
 Yuri Olenin - Deputy Director General for Innovation Management
 Andrei Petrov - Director General of Rosenergoatom
 Yuri Yakovlev - Deputy Director General for the State Safety Policy in the Defense Uses of Atomic Energy

General Director 
The sole executive body of Rosatom is the General Director, who manages the day-to-day operations. Sergey Kiriyenko, who headed the Russian nuclear industry in 2005, became general director of Rosatom since its creation until he got replaced on 5 October 2016, by Alexey Likhachev, former Deputy Minister for Economic Development.
 Sergey Kiriyenko (1 December 2007 – 5 October 2016)
 Alexey Likhachev (5 October 2016–present)

Public Council 
The Public Council of Rosatom works with civic organizations to utilize nuclear power, protect the environment, and ensure nuclear and radiation safety. Objectives of the council are:
 Raise public awareness of Rosatom's activities
 Involve civic organizations in making policies on nuclear power
 Negotiate nuclear issues with the general public
 Communicate efficiently with stakeholders
Council members are:
 Alexey Likhachev - General Director of Rosatom, Chairman of the Public Council
 Alexander Lokshin - First Deputy Director General for Operations Management
 Sergey Baranovsky - President of the Russian Green Cross, Chairman of the Russian Ecological Congress, Deputy Chairman of the Public Council
 Rudolf Aleksakhin - Leading Ecologist of ROSATOM's Proriv (Breakthrough) Project
 Rafael Arutyunyan - First Deputy Director of the Institute for Safe Development of Nuclear Energy of Russian Academy of Sciences
 Valery Bochkarev - Head of Radiation Safety Division, Federal Centre for Nuclear and Radiation Safety
 Natalia Davydova - Director of "Environmental Projects Consulting Institute"
 Mark Glinsky - First Deputy CEO of the Gidrospetsgeologia Geological Survey
 Vladimir Grachev - Advisor to the ROSATOM CEO, Chairman of the Public Council with the Federal Nuclear, Industrial, and Environmental Regulatory Authority of Russia (Rostekhnadzor)
 Alexander Harichev - Head of Local Communities Relations Unit, Advisor to the ROSATOM CEO (Secretary of the Public Council)
 Viktor Ivanov - Deputy Director of the Russian Academy of Medicine Research Centre for Medical Radiology, Chairman of the Russian Federation Commission on Radiation Protection
 Valery Menschikov - Member of the council with the Russian Environmental Policy Centre
 Oleg Muratov - Executive Secretary of North-West Section of Russian Nuclear Society, Member of the Academy of Ecology, Safety of Human and Nature
 Alexander Nikitin - Chairman of the Bellona Foundation (Saint Petersburg office)
 Vladimir Ognev - Chairman of the Interregional Public Movement of Nuclear Industry and Power Veterans
 Natalia Shandala - Deputy General Director of Burnazyan Federal Medical and Biophysical Centre
 Yuriy Tebin - Vice-president of Chamber for Trade and Commerce of Moscow Oblast
 Albert Vasiliev - Chief Scientific Officer at the Dollezhal Research and Design Institute for Power Engineering
 Valeriy Vassilyev - Мember of the Citizens’ Assembly of Krasnodarsk Area, Public Council of the Russian Federation
 Andrey Vazhenin - Chief Doctor of Chelyabinsk Regional Clinical Oncologic Treatment Center, Сorresponding member of Russian Academy of Medical Science
 Yan Vlasov - Chairman of the Public Council for Protection of Patients’ Rights at Roszdravandzor, Co-chairman of All-Russia Union of Patients’ Public Organizations
 Sergey Zhavoronkin - Secretary of the Public Council for Nuclear Safety in Murmansk Oblast
 Elena Yakovleva - Chief Editor of the International Magazine Safety of Nuclear Technologies and Environment, Head of the Internet-project of Russian Nuclear Society
 Sergey Yudintsev - Corresponding Member of the Russian Academy of Sciences, Head of the Laboratory of Radiogeology and Radiogeoecology, Institute of Geology of Ore Deposits, Petrography, Mineralogy, and Geochemistry, Russian Academy of Sciences

Sanctions 
Nations supporting Ukraine following the 2022 Russian invasion sanctioned key Russian industries, with Rosatom and subsidiaries targeted. The Foreign, Commonwealth and Development Office of the United Kingdom announced direct sanctions against Rosatom and its executives.

See also 

 Energy policy of Russia
 Nuclear power in Russia
 Atomenergoprom, civil nuclear activities including Tekhsnabexport (fuel/uranium exporter), Rosenergoatom
 Ministry of Medium Machine Building of the USSR, Soviet ministry in charge of civil nuclear activities in the USSR
 Institute for Theoretical and Experimental Physics
 Institute for High Energy Physics
 List of companies of Russia
 Uranium One controversy
Companies similar to Rosatom
Korea Hydro & Nuclear Power
Mitsubishi Heavy Industries
Mitsubishi FBR Systems
Orano
Toshiba
Westinghouse Electric Company

References

External links 
  
 Facebook profile
 Twitter profile (Russian)
 Instagram profile (Russian)

 
Companies based in Moscow
Energy companies established in 2007
Holding companies of Russia
Nuclear companies of Russia
Russian companies established in 2007
Russian state corporations